The 1997 Missouri Tigers football team represented the University of Missouri during the 1997 NCAA Division I-A football season. The 1997 Tigers went 7–5 (5–3 in Big 12 play), ending a streak of 13 consecutive losing seasons.  However, the Tigers lost to Colorado State, 35–24, in the Holiday Bowl in San Diego. They played their home games at Faurot Field in Columbia, Missouri.  They were members of the Big 12 Conference in the North Division. The team was coached by head coach Larry Smith.

The loss to eventual National Champion #1 ranked Nebraska in overtime came after the infamous Flea Kicker play. This was a deflection reception off an unintentionally kicked pass as the receiver that was falling and tried pull the ball to his chest with his foot, resulting in a deflection off the foot that another receiver was able to dive a catch.

Schedule

Coaching staff

Game summaries

Eastern Michigan

Kansas

Tulsa

Ohio State

Iowa State

Kansas State

Texas

Oklahoma State

Colorado

Nebraska

Baylor

1997 Holiday Bowl

References

Missouri
Missouri Tigers football seasons
Missouri Tigers football